San Felipe de Jesús Municipality is a municipality in Sonora in north-western Mexico.

The municipal area is 152.8 km2,  with a population of 416 registered in 2000. 

Neighboring municipalities are  Banámichi Municipality, Aconchi Municipality, Opodepe Municipality, and Huépac Municipality.

References

Municipalities of Sonora